Schmeck is a surname. Notable people with the surname include:

 Herbert Schmeck (1890–1956), American roller coaster designer
 Ingrid Schmeck (born 1944), German visual artist

See also
 Das große Abenteuer des Kaspar Schmeck, 1982 East German film 
 Schmeckfest, festival in South Dakota

German-language surnames